Kentucky Route 420 (KY 420) is a  state highway in the U.S. state of Kentucky. The highway connects southern parts of Franklin County with Frankfort.

Route description

KY 420 begins at an intersection with U.S. Route 127 (US 127) south of Frankfort, within the southern part of Franklin County, where the roadway continues as Old Lawrenceburg Road. It travels to the east-southeast and curves to the east. It intersects the southern terminus of KY 3163 (Lawrenceburg Road). It curves to the northeast and crosses over Cedar Run. Then, it begins to parallel that creek. It intersects the southern terminus of KY 1263 (Johnson Road). It curves to the north and travels under two overpasses that carry Interstate 64 (I-64). It then crosses over Cedar Run. The highway very briefly travels along the southeastern edge of the city limits of Frankfort. Just after it leaves the city limits, it begins a brief concurrency with KY 676 (East–West Connector). The two highways cross over Cedar Run. When KY 420 splits off, it travels to the north-northwest and crosses over Cedar Run. It then enters Frankfort and intersects the northern terminus of KY 1263. It curves to the north-northeast and travels under a parking garage for the Kentucky State Capitol. It then travels just to the east of the capitol. It curves to the west-northwest and enters downtown Frankfort. KY 420 turns right, to the north-northeast, onto Capital Avenue. It then begins a concurrency with U.S. Route 60 (West 2nd Street). The two highways cross over the Kentucky River on the War Mothers Memorial Bridge and immediately split. One block later, KY 420 splits onto one-way streets. Northbound traffic uses High and Mero streets, while southbound traffic uses Ann and Clinton streets. Both directions of traffic travel to the north-northeast and cross over some railroad tracks. They pass the Thomas D. Clark Center for Kentucky History. Northbound traffic then passes the Frankfort State Office Building, which houses the Kentucky Department of Revenue, and then intersects the southern terminus of KY 2261 (Holmes Street). Both directions of traffic head to the west-northwest. Northbound traffic passes the headquarters of the Kentucky Transportation Cabinet. Then, southbound traffic passes the Old State Capitol building. Both directions pass the Frankfort Convention Center. After that, northbound traffic passes the Kentucky Department of Education. Immediately, the highway meets its northern terminus, an intersection with US 127/US 421 (Wilkinson Boulevard / West Frankfort Connector). This intersection is on the southeastern edge of River View Park.

Major intersections

See also

References

0420
Transportation in Franklin County, Kentucky
Frankfort, Kentucky micropolitan area